The 1984 Sandown 1000 was an endurance motor race staged at the Sandown Raceway in Victoria, Australia on 2 December 1984. It was the eleventh and final round of the 1984 FIA World Endurance Championship and was the first FIA World Championship race to be held in Australia. It was to be the first of a three-year contract to race at Sandown, though the final two years would be cancelled.

The event was the final round of the World Endurance Championship for Drivers but did not count towards the associated World Endurance Championship for Manufacturers, the Group C2 Prototype FIA Cup, or the FIA Grand Touring Cup. The race was open to Group C1 Sports Prototypes, Group C2 Sports Prototypes, Group B GT Cars and IMSA GTP, GTX, GTO & GTU cars. With their drivers no longer in a position to win the Drivers Championship and no manufacturers points on offer, the Martini Racing team did not participate in this event with their Ferrari powered Lancia LC2s.

An invitational class for "Australian Cars" (AC) was also included for cars that raced in the Australian GT Championship, and the Australian Sports Car Championship. These Group D GT, Group B Sports Sedan, and Group A Sports Cars, did not conform to World Endurance Championship regulations. The FIA only allowed five AC cars to compete and the drivers were not eligible to score championship points. Only four of these cars started, with the Bryan Thompson / Brad Jones Mercedes-Benz 450 SLC powered by a twin turbo, 4.2 litre Chevrolet V8 engine did not start due to overheating issues in practice and qualifying.

Fittingly in Australia's first ever FIA World Championship event, the race included Australia's only two World Drivers' Champions. Sir Jack Brabham (1959, 1960 & 1966) and Alan Jones (1980) both participated as part of the factory backed Rothmans Porsche team. The race was Sir Jack's first and only World Championship race since the 1970 Mexican Grand Prix, though between 1970 and 1984 he had been a semi-regular competitor in Australian touring car racing.

The race proved to be a financial disaster for promoters, the Light Car Club of Australia. The club failed to secure a major sponsor for the race, and were late in arranging a television deal so the race could be broadcast back to Europe. It wasn't until the last minute that the ABC decided to telecast the race (of Australia's major television stations, the Seven Network was committed to showing the 1984 Australian Open tennis from Kooyong in Melbourne, Channel 9 was showing a match between Victoria and the touring West Indies cricket team at the Melbourne Cricket Ground while Channel 10 was covering the Australian federal election). The official attendance was just 13,860, though many observers put the figure at less than 10,000. It was estimated that the LCCA lost anywhere from A$300,000 to 500,000 on the race.

Qualifying 
As expected, the factory Rothmans Porsche 956 of Stefan Bellof took pole with a time of 1:31.600 (prior to the race, the lap record of the new 3.9 km circuit was 1:36.9 set by John Bowe in a 1.6 litre Ford powered Ralt RT4/85 Formula Mondial car during the final round of the 1984 Australian Drivers' Championship). Sharing the front row was his teammate and rival for the World Endurance Championship Jochen Mass with a lap of 1:32.300.

British driver Gordon Spice qualified 12th and was the fastest Group C2 runner with a time of 1:38.000 in his 3.3 litre Tiga CG84-Cosworth DFL.

Four times CAMS Gold Star winner, Melbourne resident Alfredo Costanzo, qualified the 1984 Australian Sports Car Championship winning Romano WE84-Cosworth he would share with car owner Bap Romano in 13th place and fastest of the AC class with a 1:38.400 lap, despite persistent understeer in the slow corners (due to 70 kg of lead ballast the car was required to carry for the race), Costanzo twice stripping second gear in the car and an overnight engine change from the 3.0 litre Cosworth DFV engine to a more powerful 3.9 litre Cosworth DFL.

In the only IMSA car in the field, American driver Jim Cook qualified 15th in Chuck Kendall's Lola T600-Chevrolet V8 with a 1:39.500, while Altfrid Heger qualified his Group B BMW M1 in 28th with a time of 1:50.500. The Group B BMW M1's (powered by the 3.5 litre BMW M88 Straight-six engine) actually proved slower than the production based Australian Group C touring cars had been at the circuit three months earlier, including being almost 3 seconds slower than the BMW 635 CSi touring car which used the same M88 engine.

Race
Without the factory Lancia's, the Group C class turned into a Porsche benefit with the first 10 places on the grid being filled by the 956 model and position 11 being the newer Porsche 962 run by John Fitzpatrick Racing for Australia's "Mr Versatile" of motor racing Colin Bond, and open wheel driver Andrew Miedecke.

Alan Jones had the honour of leading the first lap of the race having got the jump on temporary teammates Bellof and Mass. As in qualifying, the race was a Porsche benefit with the German cars finishing in the top 9 places (the 962 of Bond/Miedecke finished 6th). Rothmans Porsche drivers Bellof and Derek Bell won the race, giving Bellof the 1984 World Endurance Championship in the process. Teammates Jochen Mass and Jacky Ickx finished three laps behind in 2nd, with Jonathan Palmer and Jan Lammers a further lap down in 3rd place in their Richard Lloyd Racing 956B. The only car to actually challenge the Rothmans Porsche's during the race, the Skoal Bandit 956B of Thierry Boutsen and David Hobbs, was the only Group C1 car not to finish after suffering a burnt-out an ignition coil on lap 171.

The first non-Porsche finisher was the Group C2, 3.3L Cosworth DFL powered Tiga GC84 of Gordon Spice and Neil Crang in 10th place. The Tiga won C2 after a race long battle with the Italian Alba's and the German Gebhardt JC843-Cosworth. The AC class was won by the JPS Team BMW's 320i of Jim Richards and Tony Longhurst who finished in 14th place overall despite several spins and punctures caused by the road surface in the new infield section breaking up under the strain of the  ground effect Group C Porsche's. The BMW was followed in 15th place by the Group B winning BMW M1 of Helmut Gall and Altfrid Heger. The only IMSA car in the race, a Lola T600-Chevrolet run by Chuck Kendall failed to finish having completed 95 laps.

The race distance was to be 257 laps, or 1000 km (620 mi) long. However, under WEC rules, with the exception of the 24 Hours of Le Mans, races had a time limit of 6 hours. The six-hour mark was reached when the Bellof/Bell Porsche had run only 206 laps (803.4 km), thus the race was declared at the time limit some 51 laps short of the 1000 km distance.

Official results 

Note: Cars that failed to complete 75% of the winner's distance were Not Classified and are marked as NC in the above table.

Statistics 
 Group C Pole Position - Stefan Bellof - #2 Porsche 956 - 1:31.600
 Group C2 Pole Position - Gordon Spice - #70 Tiga CG84 Cosworth - 1:38.000
 AC Pole Position - Alfredo Costanzo - #61 Romano WE84 Cosworth - 1:38.400
 IMSA GTP Pole Position - Jim Cook - #131 Lola T600 Chevrolet - 1:39.500
 Group B Pole Position - Helmut Gall - #106 BMW M1 - 1:50.500
 Fastest Lap - Stefan Bellof - #2 Porsche 956 - 1:34.500
 Average Speed - 166.468 km/h

References

Further reading

External links 
 
 
 

Sandown
Sandown 1000
Motorsport at Sandown